Bendt Bendtsen (born 25 March 1954) is a Danish politician who served as Member of the European Parliament (MEP) from 2009 until 2019. He was the leader of the Conservative People's Party from 1999 to 2008, and served as Minister of Economic and Business Affairs. As a MEP, he was part of the European People's Party.

Before being elected, Bendtsen worked as a member of Odense's police force; he became a member of the Odense City Council in 1989, and he was Vice-Chairman of the Odense Criminal Police Association from 1989 to 1992.

Political career

Member of the Folketing 
Bendtsen was a temporary member of the Folketing for the Conservative Party, representing Funen County constituency, from 5 April to 24 April 1994, and he was subsequently elected as a Conservative member of the Folketing from Funen County constituency in the parliamentary election held on 21 September 1994. In the November 2007 parliamentary election he was elected from the Funen greater constituency.

Minister of Economy
Following the November 2001 parliamentary election, Bendt Bendtsen became Minister for Economic and Business Affairs and Minister for Nordic Cooperation on 27 November 2001 in the Cabinet of Anders Fogh Rasmussen I. He left the post of Minister for Nordic Cooperation on 18 June 2002, but remained Minister for Economic and Business Affairs. He retained the latter post in the Cabinet of Anders Fogh Rasmussen II (2005) and III (2007). On 9 September 2008, he tendered his resignation as leader of the party, which then elected Lene Espersen as leader, also resigning from his post as minister.

European Parliament
Bendt Bendtsen was elected Member of the European Parliament in the 2009 elections. Throughout his time in parliament, he served as member of the Committee on Industry, Research and Energy (ITRE). He was also a substitute member in the Committee on Budgets (BUDG) and Special Committee on the Financial, Economic and Social Crisis. In parliament, he was part of the European People's Party, which is the biggest political group in the parliament.

In addition to his committee assignments, Bendtsen was a member of the Parliament's delegation for relations with China from 2014 until 2019. In May 2012, he founded together with the Austrian MEP Paul Rübig and the Bulgarian MEP Nadezdha Neynsky a new organization called SME Europe, the pro-business organization within the European People's Party, which aims at improving the situation of small and medium-sized enterprises all across Europe. He held the position of First Vice-President. He was also a supporter of the MEP Heart Group, a group of parliamentarians who have an interest in promoting measures that help reduce the burden of cardiovascular diseases (CVD).

Other activities
 European Bank for Reconstruction and Development (EBRD), Ex-Officio Member of the Board of Governors (2001-2008)
 European Investment Bank (EIB), Ex-Officio Member of the Board of Governors (2001-2008)

References

Sources
 History of the Conservative People's Party - From their official webpage.

External links

 Bendt Bendtsen's homepage 
 English part of Bendt Bendtsen's homepage
 Bendt Bendtsen's page on the European Parliament website
 

1954 births
Government ministers of Denmark
Living people
People from Odense
Members of the Folketing 1994–1998
Members of the Folketing 1998–2001
Members of the Folketing 2001–2005
Members of the Folketing 2005–2007
Members of the Folketing 2007–2011
Conservative People's Party (Denmark) MEPs
MEPs for Denmark 2009–2014
MEPs for Denmark 2014–2019
Danish police officers
Leaders of the Conservative People's Party (Denmark)